Jerry Wayne Miller (December 10, 1937 – November 16, 2018) was an American racing driver from Salem, Indiana who excelled at sprint car racing and made a 3-year foray into Championship Car.

One of the top sprint car racers in the midwest, Miller attempted to complete rookie orientation for the Indianapolis 500 in 1979 but failed to do so. Later that year he competed in his first Champ Car race, a USAC event at the Milwaukee Mile and finished 9th in a field weakened by the founding of the rival CART series that year. His single appearance was enough to earn him 25th place in the USAC National Championship. In 1980 Miller made his only CART start, a 14th place in the season-ender at Phoenix International Raceway. In 1981 he brought the same Chevrolet powered King chassis back to Indianapolis to attempt to qualify for the "500" again. He completed rookie orientation that time, but failed to make the field. As the USAC/CART split continued that year, Miller made two more champ car starts, this time on the dirt oval events that had become a part of the USAC "Gold Crown" Championship, with finishes of 9th and 19th.

He died in 2018.

References

External links
Jerry Miller at ChampCarStats.com

1937 births
2018 deaths
Champ Car drivers
People from Salem, Indiana
Racing drivers from Indiana